KICN-LP is a low-power FM radio station broadcasting at 96.7 FM in Portland, Oregon, United States. It is licensed by the FCC to OPAL Environmental Justice Oregon, and broadcasts an oldies format, acting as a repeater for KQRZ-LP.

References

External links

ISN-LP
ISN-LP
Oldies radio stations in the United States